The 2011 Women's Twenty20 Cup was the 3rd cricket Women's Twenty20 Cup tournament. It took place in August and September, with 35 teams taking part: 33 county teams plus Wales and the Netherlands. Kent Women won the Twenty20 Cup, beating Berkshire Women in the final, achieving their first T20 title. The tournament ran alongside the 50-over 2011 Women's County Championship.

Competition format

Teams played matches within a series of regionalised divisions, with the winners of the top divisions progressing to semi-finals and a final. Matches were played using a Twenty20 format.

The divisions worked on a points system with positions within the divisions being based on the total points. Points were awarded as follows:

Win: 2 points. 
Tie: 1 points. 
Loss: 0 points.
Abandoned/Cancelled: 1 point.

Teams 
The 2011 Women's Twenty20 Cup was divided into three regions: Midlands & North, South and South & West. Each region was further divided into divisions: Midlands & North with four, South with three and South & West with two. Teams in each division played each other once, and then the top two played in a Division Final and bottom two in a 3rd-place play-off. The winners of each Division 1, and the best-performing second-place team, progressed to the semi-finals.

Midlands & North

South

South & West

Midlands & North

Division 1

Group stage

 Source: ECB Women's Twenty20 Cup

Final

Division 2

 Source: ECB Women's Twenty20 Cup

Division 3

 Source: ECB Women's Twenty20 Cup

Division 4

 Source: ECB Women's Twenty20 Cup

South

Division 1

Group stage

 Source: ECB Women's Twenty20 Cup

Final

Division 2

 Source: ECB Women's Twenty20 Cup

Division 3

 Source: ECB Women's Twenty20 Cup

South & West

Division 1

Group stage

 Source: ECB Women's Twenty20 Cup

Final

Division 2

 Source: ECB Women's Twenty20 Cup

Knock-Out Stage

Semi-finals

Third-place play-off

Final

Statistics

Most runs

Source: CricketArchive

Most wickets

Source: CricketArchive

Notes

References

Women's Twenty20 Cup
 
cricket